Flavigny Abbey is a  former Benedictine monastery, now occupied by the Dominicans, in Flavigny-sur-Ozerain, Côte-d'Or département, France. The monks at this abbey were the original makers of the well-known aniseed confectionery Anise de Flavigny.

Benedictines

This monastery was founded in 717 by Widerad, who richly endowed it. According to the authors of the Gallia Christiana the new abbey, placed under the patronage of Saint Praejectus (Prix), Bishop of Clermont, and martyr, was erected on the site of an ancient monastic foundation, dating, it is said, from the time of Clovis, and formerly under the patronage of Saint Peter, who as patron eventually overshadowed and superseded Saint Prix. Pope John VIII dedicated the new church about the year 877, from which time the patronage of Peter appears to have prevailed definitively.

The fame of Flavigny was due partly to the relics which it preserved, and partly to the piety of its monks. The monastery was at the height of its reputation in the eighth century, in the time of the Abbot Manasses, who was appointed by Pippin the Short. In 755 Manasses transferred from Volvic to Flavigny the relics of Saint Praejectus. In 760/62, Manasses attended the council of Attigny. Pippin's successor, Charlemagne, authorized Manasses to found the Carolingian style monastery of Corbigny.  

Abbot Apollinaris, appointed by Charlemagne in 802, was also abbot of Saint-Bénigne de Dijon and Môutier-Saint-Jean. Charlemagne's son, Louis the Pious, used Abbot Adrevaldus as an envoy to Septimania in 834 and 838, according to the Historia Hludowici imperatoris. However, these dates do not correspond to those given in the abbey's only list, which says that Adrevaldus became abbot in 839 and ruled for three years. Eygilo, the founder of Prüm Abbey, left his own establishment to become abbot of Flavigny in 860. He set up monks at Corbigny, but later left Flavigny when he was appointed  Archbishop of Sens. His successor, Geylo, resigned to become abbot of Tournus and was later appointed bishop of Langres.

At Flavigny were preserved the relics of Saint Regina, whom her acts represent as having been beheaded for the faith in the town of Alise (since called after her Alise-Sainte-Reine). The translation of Regina (21–22 March 864) is narrated in a contemporary account.

In 877, Adalgar, the bishop of Autun (875–94), took control of Flavigny and appointed Wolfard as its abbot. This man was a brother-in-law of the Emperor Louis II and had been ordained by the pope. In 880 or 881 he signed a charter of King Carloman II as the royal "protochancellor". After his death, only rectors were appointed to rule Flavigny on the bishop's behalf. The rector Girfred was accused of poisoning Adalgar at Tournus on his way to Rome. Adalgar's successors, Walo (894–919) and Hervé (919–935), continued to rule Flavigny. Walo and Hervé were the brother and son, respectively, of Count Manasses of Autun.

Episcopal rule at Flavigny continued under Bishops Rotmund (935–68), Gerald (968–77) and Walter (977–1018). Rotmund returned to the practice of appointing abbots, and of these he himself appointed no less than four. One abbot, Fulcher, was also abbot of Saint-Bénigne. Another, Milo, a nephew of the prelate Adrald, continued on as abbot under Bishops Gerald and Walter. When Milo died, Walter appoint Robert, a relative of the counts of Nevers, in his place, but Robert was removed for incompetence and transferred to the priory of Corbigny. The next abbot to be appointed, Heldric, was a Cluniac monk who restored regular monastic life to Flavigny. He was simultaneously abbot of Môutier-Saint-Jean and Saint-Germain-d'Auxerre.

Heldric's successor, Amadeus, restored abbatial control over Corbigny and established new monastic houses at Couches, Semur and Beaulieu. His successor, Aymo (c. 1040), was forced to resign by Pope Leo IX on account of simony. Aymo died on 26 December, year unknown. His successor, Odo I, a monk from Montiéramey, resigned after only two years in office and died on 26 August, year unknown. After the abbacy of Raynald (1084–90), a brother of Duke Odo I of Burgundy, the post was vacant for seven years (except for the two-month rule of one Elmuin).

After this interregnum, the Abbot Hugh succeeded to the office. He wrote a Chronicle, a Martyrology and a Necrology, but according to church historian Henri Leclercq they "have either perished or contain few facts of real interest". Hugh owed his appointment to the influence of Archbishop Hugh of Lyon and Bishop Agano of Autun. After many conflicts, Abbot Hugh was forced to resign in 1100. His replacement was the prior, Girard.

The monastery was rebuilt in the 17th century and occupied by Benedictines of the Congregation of St. Maur, who were actively employed in research concerning the historical documents of the abbey, but the results of their studies were lost during the French Revolution, when the abbey was dissolved.

Dominicans
In the 1840s Lacordaire rebuilt and restored all that remained of the monastery surrounded by a portion of its ancient estate, and established there a priory of the Order of St. Dominic.

Abbots
Magoald, abbot from 717, died on 24 July year unknown
Gayroinus, abbot in 748, died 6 July 755
Manasses, abbot from 755, died in office 5 November 787
Adaloald, abbot 787–91
Zacho, abbot from 791, died in office 9 May 795
Alcuin, abbot 795–802, resigned
Apollinaris, abbot from 802, died in office 1 April 826
Vigilius, abbot from 828 after a two-year vacancy
Adrevaldus, abbot from 834 or 839, perhaps until 842
Marianus, abbot from 840/41 or 845
Vulfald, dates unknown, succeeded Marianus
Warin, lay rector in 849
Sarulf, dean under Warin
Goser, died 855
Hugh, abbot 856–60
Eygilo, abbot 860–66
Geylo, abbot 866–70
Sigard, abbot from 870 until at least 872
Abbey controlled by diocese of Autun from 877 until 992
Wolfard, abbot circa 880, died 6 September year unknown
Girfred, rector in 894
Otbert, prelate during 894–919
Raingus, prelate during 894–919
Gausarius, prelate during 919–35
Raino, abbot during 935–68
Wichard, abbot during 935–68, died 14 June year unknown
Fulcher, abbot after 935, died 28 April 955
Adrald, prelate in 966
Milo, abbot during 955–92, died 5 December year unknown
Robert, abbot during 977–92
Heldric, abbot from 992, died in office 14 December 1009
Amadeus, abbot from 1010 until at least 1037, died 19 March year unknown
Aymo, abbot until 1049
Odo I, abbot 1049–51
Odo II, abbot from 1051, died in office 9 August 1084
Raynald, abbot from 1084, died in office 10 February 1090
Elmuin abbot for two months during 1090–97
Hugh, abbot 1097–1100
Girard, abbot from 1100 until at least 1113

Notes

Sources

{{Those of My Blood: Creating Noble Families in Medieval Francia
By Constance Brittain Bouchard, p. 144}}

Benedictine monasteries in France
Dominican monasteries in France
Carolingian architecture
1840s establishments in France
Christian monasteries established in the 8th century
Buildings and structures in Côte-d'Or
8th-century establishments in Francia
Churches completed in 721
8th-century churches